Héctor Dayron Fuentes Valdés (born 19 May 1988 in Marianao, La Habana) is a male triple jumper from Cuba. His personal best jump is 17.43 metres, achieved in February 2008 in Havana. In the long jump he has 7.94 metres outdoors, achieved in May 2008 in Barquisimeto, and 7.95 metres indoors, achieved in February 2008 in Chemnitz.

Achievements

References
sports-reference

1988 births
Living people
Cuban male triple jumpers
Athletes (track and field) at the 2008 Summer Olympics
Olympic athletes of Cuba
Universiade medalists in athletics (track and field)
Universiade silver medalists for Cuba
Medalists at the 2009 Summer Universiade
21st-century Cuban people